Brad Phillips (born 1974 in Toronto, Canada) is a contemporary Canadian artist and writer. He is best known for his work around subjects like mental illness, suicide, fakery, addiction and pop culture. His first book of short stories, Essays and Fictions, was published in 2019. His first novel, You Don't Have to Die will be published by Tyrant Books in 2021.

Life and education 

Phillips grew up in the Toronto suburbs of Pickering and Scarborough. He resided in Vancouver between 2002 and 2013 and currently lives in Miami Beach, Florida.

He is married to the artist and poet Cristine Brache.

Artwork 

Aesthetically, Phillips is noted for his photorealist style and often references his own photographs to compose his paintings. He is known for his dark and often sinister imagery as well as text-based works, many of which include literary references. He often employs satire, autobiography, and black humor in his paintings. Phillips tends not to contextualize his work or speak about his intentions.

Phillips has had notable solo exhibitions at James Fuentes LLC (New York), Division Gallery (Toronto), Fierman Gallery (New York), Wallspace Gallery (New York), Monte Clark Gallery (Vancouver and Toronto), Residence Gallery (London, UK), Groeflin Maag Galerie (Zurich), Galerie ZK (Berlin), and at the Liste 07 Young Art Fair (Basel). His 2013 exhibition at Louis B. James Gallery was listed as one of the top 100 Fall shows by Modern Painters (magazine). His 2019 exhibition at Harper's Books was listed as one 18 shows not to miss in New York on Artnet, and was critic's picks in Artforum. His work has also been included in group exhibitions at the Contemporary Art Gallery, the Museum of Comic and Cartoon Art, The Museum of Contemporary Canadian Art, and in Guy Maddin's "The Keyhole Project" at the Beursschouwburg in Belgium and has been shown at international art fairs, including the Armory Show in New York, the NADA Fair in Miami, the Toronto International Art Fair and others. Phillips, representing Western Canada, was a finalist in the RBC Canadian Painting Competition in 2004. Phillips' artwork has been featured in The New York Times, Mousse Magazine, Blackbook, frieze, Carte Blanche Volume II, The Walrus. In 2017, Phillips began a conceptual t-shirt project that has become a minor online phenomenon.

Collections 

Phillips' works are included in the collections of the Glenbow Museum, the Capital Group Companies, the Royal Bank of Canada, Hauser & Wirth Collection, and the Toronto philanthropist W. Bruce C Bailey. In 2017, Phillips was commissioned to create a large scale painting for the Willis Tower in Chicago (formerly the Sears Tower).

Writing

Phillips' first book of short stories, Essays and Fictions, was published by Tyrant Books in January 2019. There was an extensive feature on Phillips in Purple Magazine's 2020 S/S Edition, The Brain Issue 
Articles written by Phillips have been published in Modern Painters (magazine), The Enemy, The Art Book Review, Muumuu House, and Hunter and Cook. Artists he has interviewed for journals include Jeff Wall, Sean Landers, Daniel Gordon, Laura Owens and Kirsten Stoltmann. Phillips is also a regular contributor to  Modern Painters (magazine), ArtSlant, The Art Book Review, Millions Magazine, Adult Magazine, and The Editorial Magazine, where he is a contributing editor. He is a regular contributor to Autre Magazine and Purple Fashion Magazine.

Books 
"Marital Realism" Innen Books, (2020)
"Essays & Fictions" Tyrant Books, (2019)
"Educational Material" Innen Books, (2019)
"Life before Death" PaperworkNYC, (2017)
"Domestic Photography", Innen Books, Geneva (2016)
"Family Photos", Paperwork NYC, (2016)
"Kiss Me I'm Dying", Stanley/Barker, London (2016)
"Personal Work", 8 Ball Zines, New York, (2015)
"Mother Nature Mother Creature," (2014), Perish Publishing, Toronto 
"Regular Creep," (2014), Swimmer's Group, Toronto
"The Devil May Care,"  (2014) Aaron Mcelroy, (page 5) S_U_N_ Books and Editions 
"My Apologies Accepted," (2014) Bunny Rogers cover Image, Civil Coping Mechanisms, USA
The Life and Times of William Callahan (2012) cover image, 0–100, Italy
Brad Phillips: Hope Against Reason, (2009), TV Books, New York
Brad Phillips: Suicide Note Writers Block, (2007), Cederteg/Libraryman, Stockholm, Sweden

References

External links 
Brad Phillips website
Brad Phillips at Division Gallery, Toronto / Montreal
Harpers Books, East Hampton, New York
Brad Phillips writing on ARTslant
Brad Phillips on Matisse Overload on Blouin Artinfo
Brad Phillips: Money Cubicle's The Beast on The Enemy

20th-century Canadian painters
Canadian male painters
21st-century Canadian painters
1974 births
Living people
Artists from Toronto
Writers from Toronto
21st-century Canadian essayists
Canadian male essayists
20th-century Canadian male artists
21st-century Canadian male artists